Myrcia mucugensis is a species of plant in the family Myrtaceae. It is endemic to  habitats in central Bahia, Brazil, 800 to 1000 metres above sea level. The shrub was first described in 2010 and grows to between 1.5 and 2 metres tall, with 2mm diameter fruits.

References

mucugensis
Crops originating from the Americas
Crops originating from Brazil
Tropical fruit
Endemic flora of Brazil
Fruits originating in South America
Fruit trees
Berries
Plants described in 2010